Lake Breaden is a salt lake in the Gibson Desert of Western Australia, to the northeast of Boyd Lagoon.

European discovery
Lake Breaden was named after Joseph "Joe" A. Breaden by David Carnegie in 1896 during the Carnegie expedition through remote parts of Western Australia. Breaden was Carnegie's second in command. The expedition left Coolgardie in July 1896, proceeded as far north as Halls Creek and returned by a more easterly route arriving back at Coolgardie in August 1897.

See also

 List of lakes of Western Australia

References

Breaden
Breaden, Lake